CJK Strokes is a Unicode block containing examples of each of the standard CJK stroke types.

History
The following Unicode-related documents record the purpose and process of defining specific characters in the CJK Strokes block:

References 

Unicode blocks

zh:笔画#.E9.9B.BB.E8.85.A6.E6.87.89.E7.94.A8